Sam Jamie Bird (born 9 January 1987) is a British professional racing driver who currently drives for Jaguar TCS Racing in the FIA Formula E World Championship.

Career

Formula BMW
Bird made his name in single seater racing in the Formula BMW category, coming fourteenth overall in his debut season and second in the rookie cup. He came runner up in 2005, which was only his second season in the category and also came fourth in the Formula BMW world final, the race itself was won by German Marco Holzer.

Formula Renault
For 2006, Bird entered the British Formula Renault series, where he won four races and came fourth in the championship, 111 points behind series champion Sebastian Hohenthal.

Formula Three

In 2007, Bird raced in the British Formula 3 Championship with Carlin Motorsport, in a Mercedes powered Dallara. In March 2007, Bird secured sponsorship from BP, "The brand is already prominent in the World Rally Championship" Mark Reader, BP's UK Fuels Marketing Manager, commented, "Sam's an incredible prospect and we're excited to be getting into a relationship at this stage of his career" he added. Bird was elected to the Motor Sports Association Race Elite Scheme in April 2007, along with 5 other drivers in various British series and also participated in a series of aerodynamic tests with the AT&T Williams F1 Team.

Bird moved to Manor Motorsport in the Formula 3 Euro Series in 2008 and had a testing year, finishing eleventh in the championship with 23 points – 16 of which came from second places during Saturday races at Catalunya and Le Mans. He only picked up points from three other races. For 2009, he joined McLaren Autosport BRDC Award winner Alexander Sims, 2008 Mücke Motorsport driver Christian Vietoris and 2008 Formula BMW Europe runner-up Marco Wittmann at Mücke Motorsport. He earned his first pole position and fastest laps, but failed to win a race en route to eighth in the championship.

GP2 Series
Bird missed the final round of the F3 Euroseries season to join up with the ART Grand Prix team for a GP2 Asia Series test at the Yas Marina Circuit in Abu Dhabi. He raced in the 2009–10 season for the team, where he finished seventh in the series, with a second place in the final round.

Bird contested the 2010 GP2 Series with ART, having long coveted a drive with the French team. He was fast but frequently unlucky, losing several potential results due to technical issues, engine failures and collisions for which he was not at fault. However, he managed to claim his maiden win in the series at the first race at Monza, as well as claiming his third fastest lap of the season.

For 2011, Bird moved to the iSport International team alongside Marcus Ericsson. His GP2 Asia campaign resulted in three retirements from the first four races but, after a strong start to the main series season, he was second in the Drivers' Championship - with the same number of points as leader Romain Grosjean. After this point, he gradually slipped back in the standings and finished sixth overall at the end of the season.

Bird competed for the new Russian Time squad in 2013 and enjoyed a hugely successful season. The Englishman took five wins on the way to second place in the championship, having taken the championship fight right down to the last weekend. Bird's performances, alongside teammate Tom Dillmann, secured Russian Time first place in the GP2 Series constructors' championship.

Formula Renault 3.5

Between his last two seasons in the GP2 series, Bird competed in the 2012 Formula Renault 3.5 season. He won two races and took five further podium positions to head into the final round at Catalunya in a three-way battle for the title with Robin Frijns and Jules Bianchi. He lost out on the title by just 10 points and ended up finishing third in the championship.

Formula One
On 16 November 2010 he took part in the young drivers test at the Yas Marina Circuit in Abu Dhabi, driving for Mercedes GP.

World Endurance Championship

In 2014, Bird made two guest appearances for the Ferrari AF Corse team. The first was at his home race in Britain for the 6 hours of Silverstone where he came 3rd in the GTE Amateur class. His second appearance was at the legendary 24 Hours of Le Mans. Bird took pole position in the GTE Am class, 2nd overall of all GT cars. He ran in the first stint of the race, holding the GTE Am lead until he collided with a pair of front-running LMP1 cars (the number 3 Audi and a Toyota) in wet conditions on the Mulsanne Straight.

Formula E

2014–15
In the 2014–15 Formula E season, Bird began driving for Richard Branson's Virgin Racing alongside Jaime Alguersuari. He claimed third place in the first race, the Beijing ePrix, before dominating the second race of the season in Putrajaya to claim victory from second on the grid. At the following race in Punta del Este, he did not manage to qualify and so started from 18th place and soon retired from the race after a crash in the early stages. Bird bounced back by scoring points in Buenos Aires and Miami. However, the 2015 Long Beach ePrix was another race to forget for Bird: after starting 11th, he suffered a suspension failure on lap 11 and retired from the race. Bird managed to avoid the massive first-lap collision at the 2015 Monaco ePrix and went from his qualifying position of 12th to finish fourth. The final round of the season was the 2015 London ePrix where Bird started from fourth and went on to cross the line second at his home ePrix. Race winner Stéphane Sarrazin received a 49-second penalty and so Bird was handed the win making him the first-ever Formula E driver to win their home race. He finished the season with 103 points and secured 5th place in the championship.

2015–16
At the first race of the season in Beijing, Bird only managed to finish 7th. In the next race in Putrajaya, Bird took 2nd place after Renault had a mechanical failure and the two Dragon cars of Loic Duval and Jerome d'Ambrosio had suspension failure while running 2nd and 3rd respectively. In the next race at Punta del Este, Bird finished 2nd just behind Sebastien Buemi; in Buenos Aires, Bird won after fending off Buemi who started 18th and last. Further 6th places finishes were achieved in Mexico, Long Beach and Paris, before an 11th place finish in Berlin after contact in the race. At the first race of the double-season finale in London, Bird finished 7th. In next the next race, he was forced to retire due to a throttle failure. Bird eventually finished the season in 4th place with 88 points, after being overtaken by Nicolas Prost in the championship after he won the double-header in London.

2016–17 
Bird started his season with a 13th place finish in Hong Kong after leading the race and losing more than a minute during the pit-stop sequence. He bounced back from that result by finishing second in the following round at Marrakesh, after which Bird stated that "being on the podium [was] like a victory". Following a collision with Jérôme d'Ambrosio on the final lap in Buenos Aires, the Brit returned to the podium with a solid drive in the Mexico City ePrix. At Monaco, Bird damaged his car's suspension after hitting the barriers in the early stages of the race - he was still able to set the fastest lap in his second car. Following three races in which he only managed to collect a total of 13 points, Bird became the first ever driver to win two back-to-back races in New York City. He would score two further top-five finishes at the races in Montreal and finished fourth in the drivers' standings, five positions ahead of teammate José María López.

2017–18

At the season opener in Hong Kong, Bird started from 2nd on the grid after having nearly spun his car at the hairpin on his flying lap. During the race, he passed Jean-Éric Vergne for the lead but crashed in the pitlane when coming in for his stop and hit a mechanic. Subsequently, he was given a drive-through penalty but ultimately still came out in the race lead and went on to win and take the lead in the driver's championship for the first time in his Formula E career. Bird was given a 10-place grid penalty for the incident and started the second race from thirteenth. He would finish in 5th, following the post-race disqualification of Daniel Abt, and retain his lead of the championship. Bird would go on to finish in 3rd place in the championship with 143 points, just 1 point off 2nd place finisher Lucas di Grassi.

2018–19
Bird's first podium finish of the season came in the 2019 Marrakesh ePrix, finishing in 3rd after taking pole position. In 2019, he became the first Formula E driver to win a race in every Formula E season, after winning the 2019 Santiago ePrix. Ultimately, Bird finished the season in 9th place, amassing a total of 85 points over the season.

2019–20
Bird won the opening race of the season, the 2019 Diriyah ePrix, for Envision Virgin Racing. Unfortunately, his race ended in the second round after a collision with Mitch Evans. In Santiago, Bird stormed from 16th to 10th, achieving the fastest lap of the race. In the 2020 Mexico City ePrix, he crashed out of 2nd place in the dying stages of the race. In Marrakesh, he finished 10th again after starting 14th. The rest of the season was put on hold due to the COVID-19 pandemic, during which Bird announced that he was leaving Virgin to join Jaguar Racing. The season 6 finale was held at Tempelhof Airport Street Circuit, between the 5th and 13th of August. Bird finished the first race in 3rd and the second race in 6th. He finished the next three races in 13th, 11th, and 20th after being caught in a pile-up on the first lap. In his last race for Virgin, Bird finished 5th after starting 14th and taking the fastest lap. He finished the season ranked 10th in the standings with 63 points.

2020–21
During the Summer of 2020, Bird announced that he would be driving for the Jaguar Racing team in the 2020–21 Formula E season. In the second race of the campaign Bird continued his streak  of being the only driver to win a race in every season of Formula E, winning the second round of the Diriyah ePrix. A second place at the following race in Rome meant he took over from Nyck de Vries as championship leader ahead of former teammate Robin Frijns. After 6 DNFs (did not finish) and 1 DSQ (disqualification) during the season, he still managed to finish with 87 points in an impressive 6th place in the championship.

2021-22
Throughout the season, Bird struggled with consistency and after five races had only achieved points in Diriyah and Rome. Other points finishes came in Berlin, Jakarta, Marrakesh, and New York. However, he never managed to achieve a finish higher than 4th. Bird had to miss both rounds of the Seoul ePrix after sustaining a broken hand during the London ePrix. His place was taken by Jaguar reserve driver Norman Nato. This was the first time in his Formula E career that Bird had failed to score either a win or a podium. He finished the season 13th with 51 points.

2022-23
The 2023 season brought about a new set of regulations and the debut of the gen 3 car with Bird confident he turn around his fortune after a difficult 2022 season. He did, however, have a rude awakening as software problems hampered his preparations in practice for the Mexico City ePrix and he only qualified 21st. His race was not much better as it ended prematurely on lap 6 with a driveshaft failure.

Personal life
He was educated at Charterhouse School until GCSE level, after which he attended Millfield School in Somerset. He successfully proposed to his partner, Hollie, after winning the GTE-Pro class race at the 2017 6 Hours of Bahrain. Their wedding was held on 23 August 2018 in Lake Como, Italy. Bird is a keen football fan and an avid supporter of Manchester United F.C.

Racing record

Career summary

† As Bird was a guest driver, he was ineligible for points.
* Season still in progress.

Complete Formula 3 Euro Series results
key) (Races in bold indicate pole position; races in italics indicate fastest lap)

Complete GP2 Series results
(key) (Races in bold indicate pole position; races in italics indicate fastest lap)

Complete GP2 Asia Series results
(key) (Races in bold indicate pole position; races in italics indicate fastest lap)

Complete Formula Renault 3.5 Series results
(key) (Races in bold indicate pole position; races in italics indicate fastest lap)

Complete FIA World Endurance Championship results
(key) (Races in bold indicate pole position; races in italics indicate fastest lap)

Complete 24 Hours of Le Mans results

Complete IMSA SportsCar Championship results
(key) (Races in bold indicate pole position; races in italics indicate fastest lap)

Complete Formula E results
(key) (Races in bold indicate pole position; races in italics indicate fastest lap)

† Driver did not finish the race, but was classified as he completed over 90% of the race distance.

References

External links

 
 
 Sam Bird's ESPNF1 column

1987 births
Living people
People from Roehampton
People educated at Millfield
English racing drivers
Formula BMW UK drivers
British Formula Renault 2.0 drivers
British Formula Three Championship drivers
Formula 3 Euro Series drivers
GP2 Asia Series drivers
GP2 Series drivers
World Series Formula V8 3.5 drivers
24 Hours of Daytona drivers
24 Hours of Le Mans drivers
WeatherTech SportsCar Championship drivers
FIA World Endurance Championship drivers
Formula E drivers
Carlin racing drivers
Fortec Motorsport drivers
Manor Motorsport drivers
Mücke Motorsport drivers
ART Grand Prix drivers
ISR Racing drivers
Russian Time drivers
AF Corse drivers
Starworks Motorsport drivers
Envision Virgin Racing drivers
Jaguar Racing drivers
G-Drive Racing drivers
Motopark Academy drivers
ISport International drivers
OAK Racing drivers